

A–J 

To find entries for A–J, use the table of contents above.

K 

 Kablík. – Josephine Ettel Kablick (also as Josefina Kablíková) (1787–1863)
 Kache – Paul Kache (1882–1945)
 Kadereit – Joachim Walter Kadereit (born 1956)
 Kaempf. – Engelbert Kaempfer (1651–1716)
 Kai Müll. – Kai Müller (born 1975)
 Kalchbr. – Károly Kalchbrenner (1807–1886)
 Kalkman – Cornelis Kalkman (1928–1998)
 Kallenb. – Franz Joseph Kallenbach (1893–1944)
 Källersjö – Mari Källersjö (born 1954)
 Kalm – Pehr Kalm (1716–1779)
 Kaltenb. – Johann Heinrich Kaltenbach (1807–1876)
 Kamel – Georg Joseph Kamel (1661–1706)
 Kamelin – Rudolf V. Kamelin (Born 1938)
 Kamieński – Franciszek Michailow von Kamieński (1851–1912)
 Kanai – Hiroo Kanai (born 1930)
 Kanda – Hiroshi Kanda (born 1946)
 Kane – Katharine Sophia Bailey Kane (1811–1886)
 Kaneh. – Ryōzō Kanehira (1882–1948)
 Kanér – Oskar Richard Kanér (born 1878)
 Kanes – William H. Kanes (born 1934)
 Kanis – Andrias Kanis (1934–1986)
 Kanitz – August Kanitz (1843–1896)
 Kanjilal – Upendranath Kanjilal (1859–1928)
 Kann – Edith Kann (1907–1987)
 Kanouse – Bessie Bernice Kanouse (1889–1969)
 Kantsch. – Zaiharias A. Kantschaweli (1894–1932)
 Kantvilas – Gintaras Kantvilas (born 1956)
 Kapadia – Zarir Jamasji Kapadia (born 1935)
 Kappl. – August Kappler (1815–1887)
 Kar. – Grigorij Silych Karelin (1801–1872)
 Kar.-Castro – Vesna Karaman-Castro (fl. 2006)
 Karremans – Adam Philip Karremans (born 1986)
 Karst. – Gustav Karl Wilhelm Hermann Karsten (1817–1908)
 Kartesz – John T. Kartesz (fl. 1990)
 Karw. – Wilhelm Friedrich Karwinsky von Karwin (1780–1855)
 K.A.Sheph. – Kelly Anne Shepherd (born 1970)
 Kashyap – Shiv Ram Kashyap (1882–1934) 
 Kasper – Andrew Edward Kasper (born 1942)
 Katinas – Liliana Katinas (born 1961)
 Kattari – Stefan Kattari (fl. 2016)
 Kaul – Kailash Nath Kaul (1905–1983)
 Kaulf. – Georg Friedrich Kaulfuss (1786–1830)
 Kausel – Eberhard Max Leopold Kausel (1910–1972)
 Kavina – Karel Kavina (1890–1948)
 Kawah. – Takayuki Kawahara (fl. 1995)
 Kaz.Osaloo – Shahrokh Kazempour Osaloo (born 1966)
 K.Bergius – Karl Heinrich Bergius (1790–1818)
 K.Brandegee – Mary Katharine Brandegee (1844–1920)
 K.Brandt – Andreas Heinrich Karl Brandt (1854–1931)
 K.Bremer – Kåre Bremer (born 1948)
 K.D.Hill – Kenneth D. Hill (1948–2010)
 K.D.Koenig – Charles (Karl) Dietrich Eberhard Koenig (König) (1774–1851)
 Kearney – Thomas Henry Kearney (1874–1956)
 Keating – William Hippolitus (Hypolitus, Hypolite) Keating (1799–1844)
 Keay – Ronald William John Keay (1920–1998)
 Keck – Karl Keck (1825–1894)
 Keener – Carl Samuel Keener (born 1931)
 Keighery – Gregory John Keighery (born 1950)
 Keissl. – Karl von Keissler (1872–1965)
 Kellermann – Jürgen Kellermann (born 1972)
 Kellerm. – William Ashbrook Kellerman (1850–1908)
 Kellogg – Albert Kellogg (1813–1887)
 Kellow – Alison Valerie Kellow (born 1969)
 Kelly – Howard Atwood Kelly (1858–1943)
 Kemmler – Carl Albert Kemmler (1813–1888)
 Kem.-Nath. – Liubov Manucharovna Kemularia-Nathadze (1891–1985)
 Keng – Yi Li Keng (1897–1975)
 Keng f. – Pai Chieh Keng (born 1917)
 Kenneally – Kevin Francis Kenneally (born 1945)
 Kenrick – Paul Kenrick (fl. 1999)
 Kent – William Saville-Kent (1845–1908)
 Ker – Charles Henry Bellenden Ker (1785–1871)
 Keraudren – Monique Keraudren (1928–1981)
 Kerch. – Oswald Charles Eugène Marie Ghislain de Kerchove de Denterghem (1844–1906)
 Kereszty – Zoltán Kereszty (born 1937)
 Ker Gawl. – John Bellenden Ker Gawler (1764–1842)
 Kerguélen – Michel François-Jacques Kerguélen (1928–1999)
 Kernst. – Ernst Kernstock (1852–1900)
 Kerr – Arthur Francis George Kerr (1877–1942)
 Kers – Lars Erik Kers (born 1931)
 Kerst. – Otto Kersten (1839–1900)
 Keyserl. – Alexander Friedrich Michael Leberecht Arthur von Keyserling (1815–1891)
 K.F.Parker – Kittie Fenley Parker (1910–1994) 
 K.F.R.Schneid. – Karl Friedrich Robert Schneider (1798–1872)
 K.F.Schimp. – Karl Friedrich Schimper (1803–1867)
 K.G.Pearce – Katharine Georgina Pearce (fl. 2003)
 K.Hammer – Karl Hammer (born 1944)
 Khawkine – Mardochée-Woldemar Khawkine (1860–1930) (alternate spelling of Waldemar Mordecai Wolff Haffkine)
 K.Heyne – Karel Heyne (1877–1947)
 K.Hoffm. – Käthe Hoffmann (1883–1931)
 Khoon – Meng Wong Khoon (fl. 1982)
 Kiaersk. – Hjalmar Kiærskou (1835–1900)
 K.I.Chr. – Knud Ib Christensen (1955–2012)
 Kidst. – Robert Kidston (1852–1924)
 Kies – Pauline Kies (1918–1999)
 Kiew – Ruth Kiew (born 1946)
 Kiggel. – Franz (François, Franciscus) Kiggelaer (1648–1722)
 K.I.Goebel – Karl Ritter von Goebel (1855–1932) (also known as Karl Immanuel Eberhard Goebel)
 Killias – Eduard Killias (1829–1891)
 Killick – Donald Joseph Boomer Killick (born 1926)
 Killip – Ellsworth Paine Killip (1890–1968)
 Killmann – Dorothee Killmann (born 1972)
 Kimnach – Myron William Kimnach (1922–2018)
 Kimura – Arika Kimura (1900–1996)
 Kindb. – Nils Conrad Kindberg (1832–1910)
 Kindt – Christian Sommer Kindt (1816–1903)
 King – George King (1840–1909)
 Kingdon-Ward – Frank Kingdon-Ward (1885–1958)
 Kinney – Abbot Kinney (1850–1920)
 Kippist – Richard Kippist (1812–1882)
 Kirby – Mary Kirby (1817–1893)
 Kirchn. – Emil Otto Oskar von Kirchner (1851–1925)
 Kirk – Thomas Kirk (1828–1898)
 Kirp. – Moisey Elevich Kirpicznikov (1913–1995)
 Kirschl. – Frédéric Kirschleger (1804–1869)
 Kirschner – Jan Kirschner (born 1955)
 Kirschst. – Wilhelm Kirschstein (1863–1946)
 Kirt. – Kanhoba Ranchoddâs Kirtikar (1849–1917)
 Kissling – Jonathan Kissling (fl. 2009)
 Kit. – Pál Kitaibel (1757–1817)
 Kitag. – Masao Kitagawa (1910–1995)
 Kitam. – Siro Kitamura (1906–2002)
 Kitt. – Martin Baldwin Kittel (1798–1885)
 Kit Tan – Kit Tan (born 1953)
 Kittell – Mary Teresita Kittell (born 1892)
 Kittlitz – Friedrich Heinrich von Kittlitz (1799–1871)
 Kittr. – Elsie May Kittredge (1870–1954)
 K.J.Brooks – K.J. Brooks (fl. 1998)
 K.J.Cowley – Kirsten Jane Cowley (born 1961)
 Kjellm. – Frans Reinhold Kjellman (1846–1907)
 K.Jess. – Knud Jessen (1884–1971)
 K.J.Kim – Ki Joong Kim (born 1957)
 K.J.Martin – Kenneth J. Martin (born 1942)
 K.J.Williams – Kyle Joseph Williams (born 1973)
 K.Koch – Karl Heinrich Emil Koch (1809–1879)
 K.Komatsu – Katsuko Komatsu (fl. 2003)
 K.Krause – Kurt Krause (1883–1963)
 K.Kurtz – Karl Marie Max Kurtz (1846–1910)
 K.Larsen – Kai Larsen (1926–2012)
 Klatt – Friedrich Wilhelm Klatt (1825–1897)
 K.L.Chambers – Kenton Lee Chambers (born 1929)
 Klein – Jacob Theodor Klein (1685–1759)
 Kleinig – David Arthur Kleinig (born 1947)
 Klinge – Johannes Christoph Klinge (1851–1902)
 K.L.McDougall – Keith Leonard McDougall (fl. 1956–)
 Klokov – Michail Vasiljevich Klokov (1896–1981)
 Kloos – Abraham Willem Kloos (1880–1952)
 Klotzsch – Johann Friedrich Klotzsch (1805–1860)
 K.Lyell – Katherine Murray Lyell (1817–1915)
 K.Madhus. – K. Madhusudhanan (fl. 2014)
 K.M.Drew – Kathleen Mary Drew-Baker (1901–1957)
 Kmet'ová – Eva Kmet'ová (born 1942)
 K.M.Feng – Kuo Mei Feng (1917–2007)
 K.M.Jenssen – Kolbjørn Mohn Jenssen (fl. 1986)
 K.M.Matthew – Koyapillil Mathai Matthew (1930–2004)
 K.Möbius – Karl Möbius (1825–1908)
 K.M.Proft – Kirstin M. Proft (fl. 2016)
 K.M.Purohit – K. M. Purohit (fl. 1979)
 K.Müll. – Konrad Müller (born 1857)
 K.M.Wong – Khoon Meng Wong (born 1954)
 Knaben – Gunvor Snekvik Knaben (born 1911)
 K.Nakaj. – Kunio Nakajima (fl. 1951)
 Knapp – John Leonard Knapp (1767–1845)
 K.Naray. – K. Narayanaswami (fl. 1946)
 Knebel – Gottfried Knebel (born 1908)
 Kneuck. – Johann Andreas Kneucker (1862–1946)
 Knight – Joseph Knight (1778–1855)
 Knobl. – Emil Friedrich Knoblauch (1864–1936)
 Knorring – Olga Knorring (1887–1978)
 Knowles – George Beauchamp Knowles (1790–1862)
 Knowlt. – Frank Hall Knowlton (1860–1926)
 Knuth – Paul Knuth (1854–1899)
 Kny – Carl Ignaz Leopold Kny (1841–1916)
 Kobuski – Clarence Emmeren Kobuski (1900–1963)
 Koch – Johann Friedrich Wilhelm Koch (1759–1831)
 Kochummen – Kizhakkedathu Mathai Kochummen (1931–1999)
 Kocyan – Alexander Kocyan (born 1965)
 Koechlin – Jean Koechlin (born 1926)
 Koehne – Bernhard Adalbert Emil Koehne (1848–1918)
 Koeler – Georg Ludwig Koeler (1765–1807)
 Koell. – Rudolf Albert von Koelliker (1817–1905)
 Koelle – Johann Ludwig Christian Koelle (1763–1797)
 K.Ohashi – Kazuaki Ohashi (fl. 2007)
 Koidz. – Gen-ichi Koidzumi (1883–1953)
 Köie – Mogens Engell Köie (1911–2000) 
 Kokwaro – John Ongayo Kokwaro (born 1940)
 Kolberg – H.H. Kolberg (fl. 2001)
 Kolen. – Friedrich August (Anton) Rudolf Kolenati (1813–1864)
 Kom. – Vladimir Leontyevich Komarov (1869–1945)
 Komiya – Sadashi Komiya (born 1932)
 Koopmann – Karl Koopmann (fl. 1879–1900)
 Koord. – Sijfert Hendrik Koorders (1863–1919)
 Koord.-Schum. – Anna Koorders-Schumacher (1870–1934)
 Kops – Jan Kops (1765–1849)
 Körb. – Gustav Wilhelm Körber (1817–1885)
 Kores – Paul Joseph Kores (born 1950)
 Kôriba – Kwan Kôriba (1882–1957)
 Körn. – Friedrich August Körnicke (1828–1908)
 Kornh. – (Georg) Andreas von Kornhuber (1824–1905)
 Korol. – Valentina Alekseevna Koroleva, also Valentina Alekseevna Koroleva-Pavlova (born 1898)
 Korsh. –  (1861–1900)
 Körte – Heinrich Friedrich Franz Körte (1782–1845)
 Korth. – Pieter Willem Korthals (1807–1892)
 K.Osada – Keigo Osada (born 1956)
 Košanin – Nedeljko Košanin (1874–1934)
 Koso-Pol. – Boris Mikhailovic Koso-Poljansky (1890–1957)
 Kostel. – Vincenz Franz Kosteletzky (1801–1887)
 Kosterm. – André Joseph Guillaume Henri Kostermans (1907–1994)
 Kotl. – František Kotlaba (1927–2020)
 Kotov – Mikhail Ivanovich Kotov (1896–1978)
 Kotschy – Carl Georg Theodor Kotschy (1813–1866)
 Kottek – Michael H. Kottek (fl. 1990)
 Kotyk – Michele E. Kotyk (fl. 2002)
 K.Põldmaa – Kadri Põldmaa (born 1970)
 K.Prasad – Kothareddy Prasad (born 1985)
 Kraenzl. – Friedrich Wilhelm Ludwig Kraenzlin (1847–1934)
 Krajina – Vladimir Joseph Krajina (1905–1993)
 Kral – Robert Kral (born 1926)
 Kralik – Jean-Louis Kralik (1813–1892)
 K.Ramach. – Kamala Ramachandran (born 1932)
 Krapov. – Antonio Krapovickas (1921–2015)
 Kras – Marta Kras (fl. 2006)
 Kras-Lap. – Marta Kras-Lapinska (born 1969)
 Krasn. – Andrej Nikovaevich Krasnov (1862–1914)
 Kraus – Gregor Konrad Michael Kraus (1841–1915)
 Krause – Johann Wilhelm Krause (1764–1842)
 Kräusel – Richard Oswald Karl Kräusel (1890–1966)
 Krauskopf – Engelbert Krauskopf (1820–1881)
 Krauss – Johan Carl Krauss (1759–1826)
 Krebs – Georg Ludwig Engelhard Krebs (1792–1844)
 Kremp. – August von Krempelhuber (1813–1882)
 Kreutz – Carolus Adrianus Johannes Kreutz (born 1954)
 Kreuz. – Kurt Kreuzinger (1905–1989)
 Kreyer – Georgij Karlowic Kreyer (1887–1942)
 K.Richt. – Karl Richter (1855–1891)
 Krock. – Anton Johann Krocker (1744–1823)
 Krok – Thorgny Ossian Bolivar Napoleon Krok (1834–1921)
 Kromb. – Jean-Henri-Guillaume Krombach (1791–1881)
 Krombh. – Julius Vincenz von Krombholz (1782–1843)
 Kron – Kathleen Anne Kron (born 1956)
 K.R.Robertson – Kenneth R. Robertson (born 1941)
 K.Rosenth. – Käthe Rosenthal (1893–1942)
 Krug – Karl (Carl) Wilhelm Leopold Krug (1833–1898)
 Krüssm. – Johann Gerd Krüssmann (1910–1980)
 K.Schum. – Karl Moritz Schumann (1851–1904)
 K.S.Prasad – Karuvankoodelu Subrahmanya Prasad (born 1983)
 Kubitzki – Klaus Kubitzki (born 1933)
 Kuchel – Rex Harold Kuchel (1917–1985~6)
 Kudô – Yûshun Kudô (1887–1932)
 Kuhbier – Manfred Heinrich Kuhbier (born 1934)
 Kuhl – Heinrich Kuhl (1797–1821)
 Kuhlm. – João Geraldo Kuhlmann (1882–1958)
 Kuhn – Friedrich Adalbert Maximilian Kuhn (1842–1894)
 Kuijt – Job Kuijt (born 1930)
 Kük. – Georg Kükenthal (1864–1955)
 Kulak – Magdalena Kułak (fl. 2006)
 Kumar – Pankaj Kumar (born 1975)
 Kunkel – Louis Otto Kunkel (1884–1960)
 Kunth – Carl Sigismund Kunth (1788–1850)
 Kuntze – Carl Ernst Otto Kuntze (1843–1907)
 Kunze – Gustav Kunze (1793–1851)
 Kuo Huang – Ling Lung Kuo Huang (fl. 2005)
 Kupicha – Frances Kristina Kupicha (born 1947)
 Kuprian. – Ludmila Kuprianova (1914–1987)
 Kurata – S. Kurata (fl. 1931)
 Kurbanb. – Z. K. Kurbanbekov (born 1935)
 Kurbanov – D. K. Kurbanov (born 1946)
 Kurbatski – Vladimir Ivanovich Kurbatski (born 1941)
 Kurczenko – Elena Ivanovna Kurczenko (born 1935)
 Kurib. – Kazue Kuribayashi (died 1954)
 Kurita – Siro Kurita (born 1936)
 Kurkiev – Uolubii Kishtishevich Kurkiev (born 1937)
 Kurl. – Boguslav Stanislavovich Kurlovich (born 1948)
 Kurogi – Munengo Kurogi (1921–1988)
 Kurok. – Syo Kurokawa (1926–2010)
 Kurr – Johann Gottlob von Kurr (1798–1870)
 Kürschner – Harald Kürschner (born 1950)
 Kurtto – Arto Kurtto (born 1951)
 Kurtz – Fritz (Federico) Kurtz (1854–1920)
 Kurtzman – Cletus P. Kurtzman (1938–2017)
 Kurz – Wilhelm Sulpiz Kurz (1834–1878)
 Kurzweil – Hubert Kurzweil (born 1958)
 Kusn. – Nicolai Ivanowicz Kusnezow (1864–1932)
 Küster – Ernst Küster (1874–1953)
 Kuswata – E. Kuswata Kartawinata (fl. 1965)
 Kütz. – Friedrich Traugott Kützing (1807–1893)
 Kuusk – Vilma Kuusk (born 1931) 
 K.V.George – K.V. George (fl. 1960)
 K.Watan. – Kuniaki Watanabe (fl. 2001)
 K.W.Dixon – Kingsley Wayne Dixon (born 1954)
 K.Wilh. – Karl Adolf Wilhelm (1848–1933)
 K.Y.Lang – Kai Yung Lang (born 1937)
 K.Y.Pan – Kai Yu Pan (born 1937)

L 

 L. – Carl Linnaeus (or Carolus Linnæus) (1707–1778)
 Labat – Jean-Noël Labat (1959–2011)
 Labill. – Jacques Labillardière (1755–1834)
 Labrecque – Jacques Labrecque (fl. 1996)
 Lacaita – Charles Carmichael Lacaita (1853–1933)
 Lace – John Henry Lace (1857–1918)
 Ladiges – Pauline Y. Ladiges (born 1948)
 La Duke – John C. La Duke (born 1950)
 Laest. – Lars Levi Læstadius (Laestadius) (1800–1861)
 Laferr. – Joseph E. Laferrière (born 1955)
 Lag. – Mariano Lagasca y Segura (1776–1839)
 Lagerh. – Nils Gustaf von Lagerheim (1860–1926)
 Lahman – Bertha Marion Lahman (1872–1950)
 Laib. – Friedrich Laibach (born 1885)
 Laing – Robert Malcom Laing (1865–1941)
 Lakela – Olga Korhoven Lakela (1890–1980)
 Lakow. – Conrad Waldemar Lakowitz (1859–1945) 
 La Llave – Pablo de La Llave (1773–1833)
 L.Allorge – Lucile Allorge (born 1937)
 Lally – Terena R. Lally (fl. 2008)
 Lam. – Jean-Baptiste Lamarck (1744–1829)
 Lama – Dorjay Lama (fl. 1992)
 Lamb. – Aylmer Bourke Lambert (1761–1842)
 Lammers – Thomas G. Lammers (born 1955)
 Lamond – Jenifer M. Lamond (born 1936)
 Lamont – Byron Barnard Lamont (born 1945)
 Lamy – Pierre Marie Édouard Lamy de la Chapelle (1804–1886)
 Lancaster – Roy Lancaster (born 1937)
 Lander – Nicholas Sèan Lander (born 1948)
 L.Andersson – Bengt Lennart Andersson (1948–2005)
 Landolt – Elias Landolt (1926–2013)
 Landrum – Leslie R. Landrum (born 1946)
 Lane-Poole – Charles Edward Lane-Poole (1885–1970)
 Laness. – Jean Marie Antoine de Lanessan (1843–1919)
 Lange – Johan Martin Christian Lange (1818–1898)
 Langenh. – Jean Harmon Langenheim (1925–2021)
 Langeron – Maurice Charles Pierre Langeron (1874–1950)
 Langeth. – Christian Eduard Langethal (1806–1878)
 Langsd. – Georg Heinrich von Langsdorff (1774–1852)
 Lank. – E. Ray Lankester (1847–1929)
 Lantz.-Bén. – Georg Boyung Scato Lantzius-Béninga (1815–1871)
 Lapeyr. – Baron Philippe-Isidore Picot de Lapeyrouse (La Peirouse) (1744–1818)
 Lapham – Increase Allen Lapham (1811–1875)
 Larrañaga – Dámaso Antonio Larrañaga (1771–1848)
 Larter – Clara Ethelinda Larter (1847–1936)
 L.A.S.Johnson – Lawrence Alexander Sidney Johnson (1925–1997)
 Lasser – Tobías Lasser (1911–2006)
 Latap. – François-de-Paule Latapie (1739–1823)
 Laterr. – Jean François Laterrade (1784–1858)
 Latiff – Abdul Latiff (fl. 1989)
 Lat.-Marl. – Joseph Bory Latour-Marliac (1830–1911)
 Latourr. – Marc Antoine Louis Claret de La Tourrette (1729–1793)
 Latz – Peter K. Latz (born 1941)
 Laurer – Johann Friedrich Laurer (1798–1873)
 Lauterb. – Carl Adolf Georg Lauterbach (1864–1937)
 Lauterborn – Robert Lauterborn (1869–1952)
 Lauz.-March. – Marguerite Lauzac-Marchal (fl. 1974)
 Lavallée – Pierre Alphonse Martin Lavallée (1836–1884)
 Lavarack – Peter S. ('Bill') Lavarack (fl. 1975)
 Lavranos – John Jacob Lavranos (1926–2018)
 Lavrent. – Georgios Lavrentiades (born 1920)
 Lawalrée – André Gilles Célestin Lawalrée (1921–2005) 
 Lawrance – Mary Lawrance (fl. 1790–1831)
 Lawson – George Lawson (1827–1895)
 Laxm. – Erich G. Laxmann (1737–1796)
 L.A.Ye – Lwin Aung Ye (fl. 2017–)
 Layens – Georges de Layens (1834–1897)
 Laz. – Andrei Sazontovich Lazarenko (1901–1979)
 L.B.Moore – Lucy Beatrice Moore (1906–1987)
 L.Bolus – Harriet Margaret Louisa Bolus (née Kensit)  (1877–1970)
 L.Borgen – Liv Borgen (born 1943)
 L.B.Sm. – Lyman Bradford Smith (1904–1997)
 L.Clark – Lois Clark (1884–1967)
 L.C.Leach – Leslie Charles Leach (1909–1996)
 L.C.Wheeler – Louis Cutter Wheeler (1910–1980)
 L.D.Gómez – Luis Diego Gómez (1944–2009)
 L.D.Pryor – Lindsay Pryor (1915–1998)
 Leadlay – Etelka A. Leadlay (born 1947)
 L.E.Anderson – Lewis Edward Anderson (1912–2007)
 Leandri – Jacques Désiré Leandri (1903–1982)
 Leandro – P. Leandro do Sacramento (1778–1829)
 Leaney – R.M. Leaney (fl. 2009)
 Leav. – Robert Greenleaf Leavitt (1865–1942)
 Leavenw. – Melines Conklin Leavenworth (1796–1832)
 L.E.Bishop – Luther Earl Bishop (1943–1991)
 Lebrun – Jean Paul Antoine Lebrun (1906–1985)
 Leclercq – Suzanne Céline Marie Leclercq (1901–1994)
 Lecomte – Paul Henri Lecomte (1856–1934)
 Leconte – John (Eatton) Leconte (1784–1860)
 Lecoq – Henri Lecoq (1802–1871)
 Ledeb. – Carl Friedrich von Ledebour (1785–1851)
 Leefe – John Ewbank Leefe (1813–1889)
 Leeke – Georg Gustav Paul Leeke (1883–1933)
 Leenh. – Pieter Willem Leenhouts (1926–2004)
 Leers – Johann Georg Daniel Leers (1727–1774)
 Lees – Edwin Lees (1800–1887)
 Leeuwenb. – Anthonius Josephus Maria Leeuwenberg (1930–2010)
 Legrand – Antoine Legrand (1839–1905)
 Lehm. – Johann Georg Christian Lehmann (1792–1860)
 Lehnebach – Carlos Adolfo Lehnebach (born 1974)
 Leibold (also F.E.Leyb.) – Friedrich Ernst Leibold (surname also spelled "Leybold") (1804–1864) (not to be confused with botanist Friedrich Leybold (1827–1879))
 Leichtlin – Maximilian Leichtlin (1831–1910)
 Leight. – William Allport Leighton (1805–1889)
 Leitg. – Hubert Leitgeb (1835–1888)
 Leitn. – Edward Frederick Leitner (1812–1838)
 Lej. – Alexandre Louis Simon Lejeune (1779–1858)
 Le Jol. – Auguste François Le Jolis (1823–1904)
 Lellinger – David B. Lellinger (born 1937)
 Lelong – Michel G. Lelong (born 1932)
 Lem. – Charles Antoine Lemaire (1800–1871)
 Le Maout – Jean Emmanuel Maurice Le Maout (1799–1877)
 Leme – Elton Leme (born 1960)
 Lemmerm. – Ernst Johann Lemmermann (1867–1915)
 Lemmon – John Gill Lemmon (1832–1908)
 Lemoine – (Pierre Louis) Victor Lemoine (1823–1911)
 Le Monn. – Louis-Guillaume Le Monnier (1717–1799)
 Lemson – Kristina L. Lemson (fl. 2007)
 L.E.Navas – Luisa Eugenia Navas (born 1918)
 Lenorm. – Sébastien René Lenormand (1796–1871)
 León – Frère León (Joseph Sylvestre Sauget) (1871–1955)
 Leonard – Emery Clarence Leonard (1892–1968)
 Lepage – Ernest Lepage (1905–1981)
 Lepech. – Ivan Ivanovich Lepechin (1737–1802)
 Lepr. – François Mathias René Leprieur (1799–1869)
 Lepschi – Brendan John Lepschi (born 1969)
 L.E.Rodin – Leonid Efimovich Rodin (1907–1990)
 Leroy – André Leroy (1801–1875)
 Les – Donald H. Les (born 1954)
 Lesch. – Jean-Baptiste Leschenault de La Tour (1773–1826)
 L.E.Skog – Laurence Edgar Skog (born 1943)
 Lesq. – Charles Léo Lesquereux (1806–1889)
 Less. – Christian Friedrich Lessing (1809–1862)
 Lester – Richard Neville Lester ((1937-2006)
 Le Thomas – Annick Le Thomas (born 1936)
 Letouzey – René Letouzey (1918–1989)
 Leunis – Johannes Leunis (1802 –1873) 
 Letr.-Gal. – Marie-Agnès Letrouit-Galinou (born 1931)
 Leussink – Jan A. Leussink (fl. 1979)
 Lév. – Joseph-Henri Léveillé (1796–1870)
 Levyns – Margaret Rutherford Bryan Levyns (1890–1975)
 L.E.Watson – Linda E. Watson (fl. 1990)
 Lewej. – Klaus Lewejohann (born 1937)
 Lewin – Ralph Arnold Lewin (1921–2008)
 Lewis – Meriwether Lewis (1774–1809)
 Lewton – Frederick Lewis Lewton (1874–1959)
 Lex. – Juan José Martinez de Lexarza (1785–1824)
 Leyb. – Friedrich Leybold (1827–1879) (not to be confused with botanist Friedrich Ernst Leibold (1804–1864), whose surname was also sometimes spelled "Leybold")
 Leyss. – Friedrich Wilhelm von Leysser (1731–1815)
 L.f. – Carl Linnaeus the Younger (1741–1783)
 L.F.Hend. – Louis Forniquet Henderson (1853–1942)
 L.Fisch. – Ludvig Fischer (1828–1907)
 L.Fuchs – Leonhart Fuchs (1501–1566)
 L.G.Clark – Lynn G. Clark (born 1956)
 L.G.Cook – Lyn G. Cook (fl. 2017)
 L.Guthrie – Louise Guthrie (1879–1966)
 L.G.Xu – Li Guo Xu (born 1936)
 L.H.Bailey – Liberty Hyde Bailey (1858–1954)
 L.H.Dewey – Lyster Hoxie Dewey (1865–1944)
 L.Henry – Louis Henry (1853–1903)
 L'Hér. – Charles Louis L'Héritier de Brutelle (1746–1800)
 L.H.Gray – Louis Harold Gray (1905–1965)
 L.Höhn. – Ludwig von Höhnel (1857–1942)
 Lhotsky – Johann Lhotsky (1800–1860s)
 Liais – Emmanuel Liais (1826–1900)
 Liang Ma – Liang Ma (fl. 2016)
 Lib. – Marie-Anne Libert (1782–1865)
 Liben – Louis Liben (1926–2006)
 Libosch. – Joseph Liboschitz (1783–1824)
 L.I.Cabrera – Lidia Irene Cabrera (born 1964)
 Licht. – Martin Lichtenstein (1780–1857)
 Liddle – David J. Liddle (?–2009)
 Lidén – Magnus Lidén (born 1951)
 Liebl. – Franz Kaspar (or Caspar) Lieblein (1744–1810)
 Liebm. – Frederik Michael Liebmann (1813–1856)
 Lightf. – John Lightfoot FRS (1735–1788)
 Lign. – Elie Antoine Octave Lignier (1855–1916)
 Lilj. – Samuel Liljeblad (1761–1815)
 Lilja – Nils Lilja (1808–1870)
 Lillie – Denis G. Lillie (1884–1963)
 Lillo – Miguel Lillo (1862–1931)
 Liltved – William Rune Liltved (born 1960)
 Limpr. – Karl Gustav Limpricht (1834–1902)
 Lincz. – Igor Alexandrovich Linczevski (1908–1997)
 Lindau – Gustav Lindau (1866–1923)
 Lindb. – Sextus Otto Lindberg (1835–1889)
 Lindeb. – Carl Johan Lindeberg (1815–1900)
 Linden – Jean Jules Linden (1817–1898)
 Lindenb. – Johann Bernhard Wilhelm Lindenberg (1781–1851)
 Lindl. – John Lindley (1799–1865)
 Lindm. – Carl Axel Magnus Lindman (1856–1928)
 Lindq. – Sven Bertil Gunvald Lindquist (1904–1963)
 Lingelsh. – Alexander von Lingelsheim (1874–1937)
 Link – Johann Heinrich Friedrich Link (1767–1851)
 Linsbauer – Karl Linsbauer (1872–1934)
 Linton – William James Linton (1812–1897)
 Lippold – Hans Lippold (1932–1980)
 Lipsky – Vladimir Ippolitovich Lipsky (1863–1937)
 L.I.Savicz – Lydia Ivanovna Savicz-Lubitskaya (1886–1982)
 Lisboa – José Camillo Lisboa (1823–1897)
 Litard. – René Verriet de Litardière (1888–1957)
 Little – Elbert Luther Little (1907–2004) 
 Litv. – Dmitrij Ivanovitsch Litvinov (1854–1929)
 Livingst. – C. Livingstone (born 1949)
 L.J.Chen – Li Jun Chen (born 1980)
 L.J.Davenp. – Lawrence James Davenport (born 1952)
 Lj.N.Vassiljeva – Ljubov Nikolaevna Vassiljeva (1901–1985)
 L.K.Escobar – Linda Katherine Escobar (1940–1993)
 L.K.Fu – Li-kuo Fu (born 1934)
 Llanos – Antonio Llanos (1806–1881)
 L.L.Daniel – Lucien Louis Daniel (1856–1940)
 L.Li – Lin Li (fl. 2008)
 L.Liu – Liang Liu (1933–2001)
 L.M.Ames – Lawrence Marion Ames (1900–1966)
 L.Martin – Lucille Martin (born 1925)
 L.Martins – Ludwig Martins (fl. 2015)
 L.McCulloch – Lucia McCulloch (1873–1955)
 L.McDougall – Lyn McDougall (fl. 1990)
 L.M.Copel. – Lachlan Mackenzie Copeland (born 1973)
 L.M.Perry – Lily May Perry (1895–1992)
 L.M.Vidal – Luis Mariano Vidal (1842–1922)
 L.Newton – Lily Newton (1893–1981)
 L.Nutt. – Lawrence William Nuttall (1857–1933)
 Lobel – Matthias de l'Obel (de Lobel) (or Matthaeus Lobelius) (1538–1616)
 Lockh. – David Lockhart (died 1846)
 Lodd. – Joachim Conrad Loddiges (1738–1826)
 Loefl. – Pehr Loefling (1729–1756)
 Loes. – Ludwig Eduard Theodor Loesener (1865–1941)
 Loeske – Leopold Loeske (1865–1935)
 Loher – August Loher (1874–1930)
 Loisel. – Jean-Louis-Auguste Loiseleur-Deslongchamps (1774–1849)
 Lojac. – Michele Lojacono (1853–1919)
 Lomakin – Aleksandr Aleksandrovich Lomakin (1863–1930)
 Lombardi – Julio Antonio Lombardi (born 1961)
 Londoño — Ximena Londoño (born 1958)
 Long – William Henry Long (1867–1947)
 Longyear – Burton Orange Longyear (1868–1969)
 Lonitzer – Adam Lonicer (Lonitzer) (also as Adamus Lonicerus) (1528–1586)
 Lönnrot – Elias Lönnrot (1802–1884)
 Loo – Adrian Hock Beng Loo (fl. 2004)
 Loosjes – Adriaan Loosjes (1761–1818)
 López Laphitz – Rita María López Laphitz (fl. 2011)
 Lorch – Wilhelm Lorch (1867–1954)
 Lord – Ernest E. Lord (1899–1970)
 Lorence – David H. Lorence (born 1946)
 Lorentz – Paul Günther Lorentz (1835–1881)
 Loschnigg – Vilim Loschnigg or Wilhelm Loschnigg (born 1897)
 Losinsk. – Agnia Sergeyevna Losina-Losinskaja (1903–1958)
 Lothian – Thomas Robert Noel Lothian (1915–2004)
 Lotsy – Johannes Paulus Lotsy (1867–1931)
 Lott – Henry J. Lott (fl. 1938)
 Loudon – John Claudius Loudon (1783–1843)
 Lounsb. – Alice Lounsberry (1872–1949)
 Lour. – João de Loureiro (1717–1791)
 Lourteig – Alicia Lourteig (1913–2003)
 Lowe – Richard Thomas Lowe (1802–1874)
 L.O.Williams – Louis Otho Williams (1908–1991)
 Lowrey – Timothy K. Lowrey (born 1953)
 Lowrie – Allen Lowrie (born 1948)
 Lowry – Porter Prescott Lowry (born 1956)
 Lozano – Gustavo Lozano-Contreras (1938–2000)
 L.Planch. – Louis David Planchon (1858–1915)
 L.Post – Ernst Jakob (Jacob) Lennart von Post (1884–1951)
 L.Preiss – Ludwig Preiss (1811–1883)
 L.R.Blinks – Lawrence Rogers Blinks (1900–1989)
 L.R.Fraser – Lilian Ross Fraser (1908–1987)
 L.Rico – Maria de Lourdes Rico (born 1955)
 L.R.Jones – Lewis Ralph Jones (1864–1945)
 L.R.Kerr –  Lesley Ruth Kerr (1900–1927)
 L.Schneid. – Eduard Karl Ludwig Schneider (1809–1889)
 L.Späth – Louis Späth (fl. 1892)
 L.S.Sm. – Lindsay Stewart Smith (1917–1970)
 L.T.Lu – Ling Ti Lu (born 1930)
 Lubag-Arquiza – Amihan Mercado Lubag-Arquiza (born 1967)
 Lucand – Jean Louis Lucand (1821–1896) 
 Luces – Zoraida Luces de Febres (1922–2015)
 Lückel – Emil Lückel (born 1927)
 Ludlow – Frank Ludlow (1885–1972)
 Luehm. – Johann George W. Luehmann (1843–1904)
 Luer – Carlyle A. Luer (1922–2019)
 Luetzelb. – Philipp von Luetzelburg (1880–1948)
 Lumley – Peter Francis Lumley (born 1938)
 Lundell – Cyrus Longworth Lundell (1907–1994)
 Lundin – Roger Lundin (1955–2005)
 Lundmark – Johan Daniel Lundmark (1755–1792)
 Lunell – Joël Lunell (1851–1920)
 L.Uribe – Antonio Lorenzo Uribe Uribe (1900–1980)
 Lush. – Alfred Wyndham Lushington (1860–1920)
 Lüth – Michael Lüth (fl. 2002)
 Lütjeh. – Wilhelm Jan Lütjeharms (1907–1983)
 Lutz – Berta Maria Júlia Lutz (1894–1976)
 Luxf. – George Luxford (1807–1854)
 L.Watson – Leslie Watson (born 1938)
 L.W.Cayzer – Lindy W. Cayzer (born 1952)
 L.W.Lenz – Lee Wayne Lenz (born 1915)
 L.W.Sage – Leigh William Sage (born 1970}
 Lý – Trân Ðinh Lý (born 1939)
 Lyall – David Lyall (1817–1895)
 Lydgate – John Mortimer Lydgate (1854–1922)
 Lye – Kaare Arnstein Lye (1940–2021)
 Lyell – Charles Lyell (1767–1849)
 Lyne – Andrew M. Lyne (fl. 1993)
 Lyons – Israel Lyons (1739–1775)

M–Z 

To find entries for M–Z, use the table of contents above.

 

1